The 2008 United States presidential election in Arizona took place on November 4, 2008, and was part of the 2008 United States presidential election. Voters chose 10 representatives, or electors to the Electoral College, who voted for president and vice president.

Arizona was won by Republican nominee and native son John McCain with an 8.48% margin of victory over Democrat Barack Obama. McCain had served as United States Senator from the state since 1987, and enjoyed high approval ratings. Prior to the election, sixteen of seventeen news organizations considered this a state McCain would win, or a red state. Some polls taken near Election Day in 2008 showed Democrat Barack Obama closer than expected to winning it, but these did not come to fruition, as McCain easily won Arizona and carried all but four of the state's 15 counties. Nonetheless, this was closer than any of McCain's Senate campaigns.

Obama became the first Democrat to win the White House without winning Gila, Greenlee, La Paz, or Pinal Counties since Arizona statehood in 1912, as well as the first to do so without winning Navajo County since Lyndon B. Johnson in 1964. Twelve years later, Obama's former vice president Joe Biden, won the state of Arizona, in part due to votes from supporters of the then-late McCain, who had an aggrieved relationship with Biden's opponent, former president Donald Trump, prior to McCain's death in 2018.

Primaries
2008 Arizona Democratic primary
2008 Arizona Republican primary

Campaign

Predictions
There were 16 news organizations who made state-by-state predictions of the election. Here are their last predictions before election day:

Polling

Opinion polls taken from February through to October 2008 showed McCain leading Obama by margins of between 1% and 21%. The final RealClearPolitics average gave the state an average of 53.8% for McCain, compared to 45.0% for Obama.

Fundraising
John McCain raised $7,448,622. Barack Obama raised $5,491,056.

Advertising and visits
Obama and his interest groups spent $1,510,900 in the state. McCain and his interest groups spent just $751. The Democratic ticket did not visit the state. Arizona native John McCain visited the state 5 times in the election campaign.

Analysis
Arizona has long been a Republican-dominated state.  At the time, it was represented in the Senate by two Republicans (John McCain and Jon Kyl). It has only supported a Democrat for president once in the last 60 years, when Bill Clinton carried it in 1996. In addition, both the Arizona Senate and Arizona House of Representatives are controlled by Republicans. However, the Governor was Democrat Janet Napolitano, and both parties held four House seats each before the election.

Arizona was McCain's home state and gave its 10 electoral votes to its favorite son. However, he won just under 54% of the vote. By comparison, he'd been reelected in 2004 with 77% of the vote, one of the largest margins of victory for a statewide race in Arizona history. This led to speculation that the race would have been far closer without McCain on the ballot. One major factor is the growing Hispanic vote in the state, a voting bloc that tends to favor the Democrats, although both George W. Bush and John McCain held moderate positions on illegal immigration.

Arizona politics are dominated by Maricopa and Pima counties, home to Phoenix and Tucson respectively.  Between them, these two counties cast almost three-fourths of the state's vote and elect a substantial majority of the legislature. Maricopa County, a Republican stronghold since 1948, gave McCain an 11-point victory.  This alone was more than enough to make up for Obama's narrow victory in Democratic-leaning Tucson. McCain also did well elsewhere throughout the state, winning the more sparsely populated counties by double digits.

The election also saw Republicans making gains in the state legislature, as the GOP picked up one seat in the State Senate and three seats in the State House.

Results
Constitution Party nominee Chuck Baldwin, Boston Tea Party nominee Charles Jay and independent candidate Jonathan Allen were registered write-in candidates in Arizona.

Results by county

By congressional district
McCain won 6 of Arizona's 8 congressional districts, including two districts (AZ-08 and AZ-05) represented by Democrats (Gabrielle Giffords and Harry Mitchell, respectively), and one other (AZ-01) represented by a Republican at the time but which voted for a Democrat (Ann Kirkpatrick) in the simultaneous U.S. House elections. Both districts Obama carried are represented by Democrats.

Electors
Technically the voters of Arizona cast their ballots for electors: representatives to the Electoral College. Arizona is allocated 10 electors because it has 8 congressional districts and 2 senators. All candidates who appear on the ballot or qualify to receive write-in votes must submit a list of 10 electors, who pledge to vote for their candidate and their running mate. Whoever wins the majority of votes in the state is awarded all 10 electoral votes. Their chosen electors then vote for president and vice president. Although electors are pledged to their candidate and running mate, they are not obligated to vote for them. An elector who votes for someone other than their candidate is known as a faithless elector.

The electors of each state and the District of Columbia met on December 15, 2008, to cast their votes for president and vice president. The Electoral College itself never meets as one body. Instead the electors from each state and the District of Columbia met in their respective capitols.

The following were the members of the Electoral College from the state. All 10 were pledged to John McCain and Sarah Palin:
 Bruce Ash
 Kurt Davis
 Wes Gullett
 Sharon Harper
 Jack Londen
 Beverly Lockett Miller
 Lee Miller
 Bettina Nava
 Randy Pullen
 Michael Rappoport

References

Arizona
2008 Arizona elections
2008